Granjeno is a city in Hidalgo County, Texas, United States. The population was 293 at the 2010 census. The city sits on the banks of the Rio Grande, near the border with Mexico. Its name comes from the granjeno tree (Celtis pallida) or spiny hackberry.

History
Founded in the late 18th century, Granjeno has a history that predates Texas statehood. Granjeno Cemetery was established in 1872 with burials from both sides of the Rio Grande. By the mid-1930s, the community consisted of several dwellings. A school established in Granjeno by 1948. Our Lady of Fatima Church was established in 1954 on land donated by Jose Concepcion Anzaldua. During the 1960s, growth in the community was stimulated by the development of a colonia. The population was estimated at 545 in 1976. Ten years later, that figure had decreased to 450. On January 26, 1993, Granjeno was incorporated as a city. The population was just over 300 in 2000. Mayor (Yvette Cabrera) and two commissioners (Jennifer Alvarez and Mike Cisneros) 

Granjeno is adjacent to the Anzalduas County Park, which is known for its moss-covered trees. Construction on the nearby Anzalduas International Bridge began in mid-2007 and the bridge became operational in late 2009.

El Granjeno Cemetery (Texas Historic Landmark) was established in 1872 with the burial of Don Antonio Garza. His brother, Don Juan Garza Escheverria, donated the surrounding land for use by the communities of El Granjeno and nearby Madero. A native of Reynosa, Mexico, Don Juan (born 1854) is buried there, along with many of his descendants. Specific instructions were spelled out in historic documents that the rear of the cemetery was to be reserved only for the burial of direct descendants of Don Juan Garza Escheverria. Also interred there are veterans of the Civil War, World War I and the Vietnam War.

Geography

Granjeno is located at  (26.138316, –98.303484). It is situated off the junction of FM 494 and Old Military Road in southern Hidalgo County, approximately four miles southwest of McAllen.

Demographics

Granjeno is part of the McAllen–Edinburg–Mission and Reynosa–McAllen metropolitan areas.

2020 census

As of the 2020 United States census, there were 283 people, 143 households, and 91 families residing in the city.

2000 census
At the 2000 census, there were 313 people, 93 households and 77 families residing in the city. The population density was 896.2 per square mile (345.3/km). There were 107 housing units at an average density of 306.4 per square mile (118.0/km). The racial makeup of the city was 97.44% White, 0.32% Asian, 1.92% from other races, and 0.32% from two or more races. Hispanic or Latino of any race were 99.36% of the population.

There were 93 households, of which 46.2% had children under the age of 18 living with them, 57.0% were married couples living together, 21.5% had a female householder with no husband present, and 17.2% were non-families. 17.2% of all households were made up of individuals, and 11.8% had someone living alone who was 65 years of age or older. The average household size was 3.37 and the average family size was 3.81.

33.9% of the population were under the age of 18, 10.2% from 18 to 24, 28.8% from 25 to 44, 15.3% from 45 to 64, and 11.8% who were 65 years of age or older. The median age was 30 years. For every 100 females, there were 90.9 males. For every 100 females age 18 and over, there were 80.0 males.

The median household income was $19,423 and the median family income was $19,904. Males had a median income of $16,705 and females $21,250. The per capita income  was $9,022. About 40.4% of families and 51.5% of the population were below the poverty line, including 71.7% of those under age 18 and 39.6% of those age 65 or over.

Education
Public education in the city of Granjeno is provided by the Hidalgo Independent School District. It is zoned to Salinas Elementary School, Ida Diaz Jr. High School, and Hidalgo Early College High School.

In addition, South Texas Independent School District operates magnet schools that serve the community.

References

Cities in Texas
Cities in Hidalgo County, Texas